Aslan-bey Melik-Yeganyan (Armenian: Ասլան բեկ Մելիք-Եգանյան, 1787—1832) is the naib (deputy) of the Dizak region, the ancestor of the Malik-Aslanov family and a grandfather of an Azerbaijani politician Khudadat bey Malik-Aslanov.

Biography 
He was born in 1787 the village of Tugh village of Dizak and was descended from the Avanid dynasty. Aslan-bey with his brother Vagan and father Baghdad-bey were forcibly converted to Islam. Under the son of the last Mehdigulu Khan (1806—1822), Aslan-bey served as minbashi (chief of troops).

Historian Mir Mehdi Khazani writes in his work "Kitabi-tarikhi-Karabagh (History of Karabakh)": "But later, during the era of the late Mehdigulu Khan and the state of Russia, Malik Aslan-bey and his sons again found progress and became governors and viceroys of the districts. Sardar (commander) Paskevich spent some time with the army in Takhti-tavus in Karabakh, which is in the district of Dizak. Aslan-bey Dizaki has been very worthy in the service of sardar Paskevich since then. During his reign he prepared a lot of copper and supplies for the army, and satisfied the commander and the army".

Some villages in this region were also under his control. According to the inventories of 1823, 1832, 1848-1849, 1863, all the main members of the clan (meaning the descendants of melik Aslan and his brothers) are shown among the beys.

Melik Aslan-beн died in 1832 and was buried in the village of Tugh.

Descendants 
Melik Aslan had many sons: Shirin-bey, Farhad-bey, Aligulu-bey, Firudin-bey, Najaf-bey, Abbas-bey and Agha-bey. From the latter he had a grandson Khudadat bey Malik-Aslanov.

One of his sons named Farhad-bey was met by the novelist Raffi in 1881. Farhad-bey became a Turk and moved away from his native roots. Islamized descendants of melik Aslan began to be called Melik-Aslanovs and all the state of the family passed to them, leaving the Christian descendants without an inheritance. The historian Leo writes about them: “These Islamized Armenians are now beys of the village of Tugh under Armenian surnames - Melik-Aslanov and Melik-Yeganov. But religion consigned to oblivion all the national duties of the distant descendants of Armenian meliks".

References

Sources 

 Anvar Chingizoglu. Məlik Yeqan və onun törəmələri. "Soy" elmi-kütləvi dərgi, 2011, № 3, p. 23–34.
 Magalyan, Artak (2007). "Artsakh melikdoms and melik houses in the 17th-19th centuries" (PDF) (in Armenian). Yerevan. p. 177, 207-209.
 State Historical Archive of the Republic of Azerbaijan (ГИААР).Ф.24.Оп. 1. Д. 142. Л. 205-207.
 Qarabağnamələr II. Baku: Yazıçı. 1991.
 Melik Hakobian, Raffi. The five melikdoms of Karabagh, (1600-1827) (in Armenian and English). p. 530.

1787 births
1832 deaths
Meliks of the Principality of Dizak
Azerbaijani nobility
Armenian nobility